Meshelsheh-ye Sofla (also Romanized as Meshelsheh-ye Soflá; also known as Mesheylshīyeh-ye Pā’īn, Mesheylshīyeh-ye Soflá, Mīshelshīyeh-ye Soflá, Mowsher Sheyeh, and Mowsher Shīyeh) is a village in Abdoliyeh-ye Gharbi Rural District, in the Central District of Ramshir County, Khuzestan Province, Iran. At the 2006 census, its population was 266, in 39 families.

References 

Populated places in Ramshir County